Collis is a surname. Notable people with the surname include:

Charles Collis (1838–1902), Irish-American US Army officer in the American Civil War
Dean Collis (born 1985), Australian rugby player
Gordon Collis (born 1940), Australian rules footballer
Jack T. Collis (1923–1998), American art director
James Collis (1856–1918), English soldier
John Collis (born 1944), British prehistorian
John Day Collis (1816–1879), British headmaster and educational writer
John Stewart Collis (1900–1984), British author
Luke Collis (born 1988), American football player
Maurice Collis (1889–1973), British colonial administrator and writer
Robert Collis (1900–1975), Irish doctor and writer
Simon Collis (born 1956), British ambassador
Steve Collis (born 1891), English football goalkeeper
Susan Collis (born 1956), British artist